Lewis-Smith House is a historic home located at Raleigh, Wake County, North Carolina, USA  It was built between 1854 and 1856, and is a two-story, three bay, Greek Revival-style frame dwelling with a low hipped roof and Italianate-style brackets. It features a two-tier pedimented entrance portico, with paired Doric order columns at the first level and well-detailed Ionic order ones at the second. Two-story, demi-octagonal projecting bays were added to the sides in the early-20th century.

It was listed on the National Register of Historic Places in 1972.

References

Houses on the National Register of Historic Places in North Carolina
Greek Revival houses in North Carolina
Italianate architecture in North Carolina
Houses completed in 1856
Houses in Raleigh, North Carolina
National Register of Historic Places in Raleigh, North Carolina